Taylorstown Historic District may refer to:

Taylorstown Historic District (Taylorstown, Pennsylvania), listed on the National Register of Historic Places in Washington County, Pennsylvania
Taylorstown Historic District (Taylorstown, Virginia), listed on the National Register of Historic Places in Loudoun County, Virginia

See also
Taylorsville Historic District Taylorsville, Kentucky, listed on the National Register of Historic Places in Spencer County, Kentucky